Liam Sumner (born 16 August 1993) is a former professional Australian rules footballer who played for the Greater Western Sydney Giants and Carlton Football Club in the Australian Football League (AFL). He was picked up by the Giants in the 2011 national draft with pick 10 and made his debut in round 6, 2012, against Carlton at Docklands Stadium.

In October 2015, Sumner was traded to the Carlton Football Club. At the end of the 2017 season, Sumner was delisted by Carlton.

References

External links

1993 births
Living people
Greater Western Sydney Giants players
Carlton Football Club players
Australian rules footballers from Victoria (Australia)
Sandringham Dragons players
Preston Football Club (VFA) players